State Road 109 (SR 109) is a north–south discontinuous State Road in the US state of Indiana. The southern segment of the highway runs from U.S. Route 40 (US 40) in the town of Knightstown north to SR 9 in Anderson. The northern segment of SR 109 runs from US 30 in Columbia City northerly to US 33 in Wolf Lake.
The first usage of the SR 109 designation dates back to 1934 with the original routing being between Columbia City and Wolf Lake. A southern section was added in 1940 between Knightstown and the Hancock–Madison County line. The southern segment was lengthened in the early 1940s and once again in the early 1950s extending the road north to just north of Anderson. The northern segment of SR 109 was shortened in Columbia City during the early 1970s. SR 109 in Madison County was moved to a new routing in the late 1990s.

Route description

Southern section
The southern segment of SR 109 begins at an intersection between Main Street (US 40) and McCullum Street in the town of Knightstown. SR 109 heads north along McCullum Street before leaving the town limits and curving towards the northwest.  The road has an interchange with Interstate 70 (I–70) in rural Henry County. SR 109 enters Hancock County passing through the town of Wilkinson. After Wilkinson, SR 109 has a four-way stop with SR 234, before entering Warrington. In Warrington the road becomes north-south once again, passing through rural Hancock County, before entering Madison County. SR 109 passes through a four-way stop with SR 38, west of Markleville, before an intersection with US 36. North of US 36, SR 109 parallels a CSX railroad track, before crossing over the railroad tracks south of Anderson. The northern terminus is at the intersection of SR 9 with I–69 (exit 26) in Anderson.

Northern section
The northern section of SR 109 starts in Columbia City at the corner of US 30 and Line Street. It heads north leaving Columbia City and entering rural Whitley County. The roadway leaves Whitley County and enters Noble County. In Noble County SR 109 passes through the community of Big Lake, before entering rural Noble County. The state road passes east of  Merry Lea environmental learning center and Bear Lake, before curving northeasterly towards the community of Wolf Lake. The state highway designation for SR 109 terminates at an intersection with US 33 and Market Street, where Market Street continues northeast.

History
The Indiana State Highway Commission authorized a state road following modern SR 109, between Columbia City and Wolf Lake, in 1934. Construction started in 1935 on the authorized segment with it being completed by 1942. A segment of state road was commissioned, between Knightstown and the Hancock–Madison County line, in March 1940. This section of roadway was originally planned as SR 7, but became a southern segment of SR 109. The northern end of the southern segment was moved north to SR 32 in Anderson in July 1941. Between late 1950 and early 1951 the northern end of the southern segment was moved north to an intersection with SR 9, just north of Anderson. The southern end of the northern segment was moved north to an intersection with the new alignment of US 30, just north of Columbia City, in late 1970 or early 1971. A new alignment for SR 109, from south of US 36 to Anderson, was constructed between 1997 and 1999.

Major intersections

References

External links

Indiana Highway Ends - State Road 109
Merry Lea Environmental Learning Center

109
Transportation in Henry County, Indiana
Transportation in Hancock County, Indiana
Transportation in Madison County, Indiana
Transportation in Whitley County, Indiana
Transportation in Noble County, Indiana
Knightstown, Indiana
Anderson, Indiana